The 2004 EBSA European Snooker Championships was an amateur snooker tournament that took place from 26 May to 5 June 2004 in Völkermarkt, Austria  It was the 13th edition of the EBSA European Snooker Championships and also doubles as a qualification event for the World Snooker Tour.

The tournament was won by 14th seed Mark Allen who defeated 13th seed Alex Borg 7–6 in the final. Almost four years later Allen cemented his reputation as one of the most promising upcoming snooker talents in the world at the time by reaching the top 16 on the World Snooker Tour for the first time in his career. Alex Borg would himself go on to win the EBSA European Snooker Championship the following year and secure World Snooker Tour for the 2005/2006 season. Borg would also retain the tournament in 2006.

Results

References

2004 in snooker
Snooker amateur tournaments
Sport in Carinthia (state)
2004 in Austrian sport
International sports competitions hosted by Austria